Atina  may refer to:

Places
Greece
Atina, Greece, a Turkish name for the City of Athens, Attica

Italy
Atina, Lazio, a comune in the Province of Frosinone
Atina, Basilicata, an ancient town near modern Elena, Basilicata

Turkey
Atina, a Laz and Georgian name for Pazar (Greek: Athína), a district in Rize Province

See also
Atina (given name)